Aesthetic is the debut EP by American rock band From First to Last, released in 2003. It was the band's first release before their debut album, Dear Diary, My Teen Angst Has a Body Count. Early pressings contain the band's original name, First Too Last, but later pressings have the name changed when the band added the "From" to the beginning of their name.

Track listing

Personnel
From First to Last
Phillip Reardon – lead vocals, unclean vocals, keyboards
Matt Good – vocals, lead guitar, backing vocals
Travis Richter – vocals, rhythm guitar, backing vocals
Joey Antillion – bass guitar
Derek Bloom – drums, percussion

Additional musicians
Maria Haycraft – vocals on "For the Taking" and "Regrets and Romance".

Additional personnel
Lee Dyess – engineering, production, mixing
Adam Krause – photography
Burn It Down Media – artwork, layout

Aesthetic demos
The demos (When the band was still known as "First too Last") of most of the songs recorded for this were released before this EP as "singles" online so that the band could get their music out to the public, these songs are without Reardon as lead vocals. These demos can still be downloaded on the internet in archives.

Members 
Travis Richter – vocals, unclean vocals, rhythm guitar
Matt Good – vocals, lead guitar
Joey Antillion – bass guitar
Derek Bloom – drums, percussion (on demo tracks "Regrets and Romance" and "Ultimatums for Egos")
Stephen Pullman — drums, percussion (on demo tracks "Such a Tragedy" and "For the Taking")

References

External links
 of the band

From First to Last albums
2003 debut EPs